Nihat Kahveci (born 23 November 1979), better known mononymously as Nihat, is a Turkish former professional footballer who played as a forward and left winger . He works as a football commentator for TRT. He has a UEFA Pro Licence.

Biography
Like most Turkish players, his shirt carries his first name, Nihat, rather than his family name, Kahveci. He married Pınar Kaşgören on 5 July 2003. Their daughter Selin was born in May 2008.

Club career

Beşiktaş
Nihat is a product of Beşiktaş's youth system and was discovered by Hürser Mustafa Cindir when Nihat played in Beşiktaş in the 1996–97 season. He joined the first team at Beşiktaş in the 1997–98 season when he was just 17, at the time John Toshack was the coach. Since then, Nihat became a key player.

Real Sociedad
In January 2002, Nihat was transferred to Real Sociedad for €5 million by then Beşiktaş coach Toshack. Nihat also joined his Turkish team-mate Tayfun Korkut in Spain.

He had his debut on January, 26 in a 3–1 loss against Celta de Vigo, coming on as a substitute in the 72nd minute for Xabi Alonso and played for 18 minutes.

His first goal came in a 2–2 draw against Rayo Vallecano on 24 February 2002. In the first half of the season, Nihat played 11 matches and scored one goal.

In 2002–03, his second season in Spain, Nihat scored a brace in the Basque derby, the opening match of the season, helping his team to win 4–2. He finished the season with 23 goals making him the league's joint-second highest scorer for the season behind Roy Makaay (29 goals) and tied with Ronaldo. That season, Real Sociedad finished second in the league that season, just two points behind Real Madrid., mostly thanks to a very fruitful strike partnership with Serbian forward Darko Kovačević, such that sports journalist Phil Ball nicknamed the pair "Little and Large", in reference to the height difference between the two (Nihat's height is 1.75 m and Kovačević's is 1.87 m). His consistent, good performances have led to interests from other clubs, to which Nihat turned a deaf ear.

In his third season at Real Sociedad, Nihat made 32 appearances scoring a total of 14 goals. Nihat also played in the UEFA Champions League with Real Sociedad as the club was paired with Juventus, Galatasaray and Olympiacos. La Real qualified to the knockout stage, but was eliminated by Olympique Lyonnais, losing 2–0 on aggregate. By the end of the season, Nihat won the Don Balón Award for Best Foreign Player.

In his fourth season, Nihat made 23 appearances and scored 13 goals. In the middle of the season, Nihat tore his ACL during a match against Sevilla which caused him to be out of action for six months.

In June 2005, reports claimed that Nihat was linked to Russian club CSKA Moscow for €20 million Euros but the move never materialized. Nihat insisted he had to concentrate on the club to prevent relegation: "I can't go now. I can't walk out on Real Sociedad, We are fighting to try and secure some tranquillity and I am one of those who thinks that the more strength there is in the team, the better. On Sunday we took a very important step in Santander, and now it is a question of continuing to take steps forward in the league.". Nihat was also linked with clubs like Chelsea and Manchester United.

In his fifth and last season at Real Sociedad, Nihat made his return from injury in a 3–0 loss in the Basque derby, against Athletic Bilbao. He went on to make 32 appearances and score seven goals. During that season, Nihat was about to sign for Russian club Spartak Moscow but had to stay for the remainder of the season due to Kovačević's injury.

Villarreal
On 16 May 2006, Nihat agreed to join Villarreal CF, on a five-year contract, on a Bosman transfer after rejecting a new contract at Real Sociedad. He tore his ACL again on 22 November 2006 during a training ground collision with team-mate Javi Venta and was out for months.  He seemed to catch up form in his second season with 18 goals in the league and four goals in the UEFA Cup, helping his club to finish the season as second in La Liga where he formed a formidable offensive pair with Robert Pires. The Spanish newspaper El Mundo named Nihat as the best player on the team. However, in the 2008–09 season, due to injuries again, Nihat made 19 appearances equalling 764 minutes of playing time but failed to score a single goal.

Return to Beşiktaş

On 27 June 2009, Nihat returned to the club where he started his career by signing for Beşiktaş J.K. on a four-year deal.  Return to Turkish football wasn't very fruitful for Nihat. Over two seasons he managed 34 appearances in the league, netting only three goals. On 25 April 2011, in a match against Konyaspor which turned out to be his last game, Nihat and the new Beşiktaş favourite Ricardo Quaresma had quarrel on the pitch. Nihat was upset at Quaresma for failing to pass the ball and the altercation was broken up by teammates. On 18 May 2011, Beşiktaş terminated Nihat's contract despite two years left on his contract and he told Turkish media: "I don't want to play in Turkey anymore.".

Retirement
Following his release by Beşiktaş, Nihat was linked with returning to Spanish clubs like his former club Real Sociedad and Castellón and as well as MLS side Los Angeles Galaxy.

After a six months without a club, on 12 January 2012; Nihat announced his retirement from football with immediate effect, saying: "I would like to share my decision to put an end to my professional career as a footballer,". After some days, Nihat told NTV Spor that his retirement was prompted by his age limiting his ability on the pitch and admitted that returning to Besiktas was a mistake and ill-judged, although stated there were some beautiful moments.

International career

2002 World Cup
Nihat made his international debut against Sweden in October 2000. In Group C at the 2002 FIFA World Cup, Nihat made his only appearance as a 79th-minute substitute for Yıldıray Baştürk against Costa Rica. His only other appearance was as a substitute in the 1–0 victory over Japan where he replaced, the goalscorer, Ümit Davala. Turkey went on to finish in third place with a 3–2 victory over Guus Hiddink's South Korea.

Euro 2008
In the final match of Euro 2008 Group A, Nihat scored twice in a pivotal match against the Czech Republic. Both teams were level on points, both having beaten Switzerland and lost to Portugal, with exactly the same number of goals scored and conceded, a win would guarantee a quarter-finals spot whilst a draw would mean penalty-shootouts would be required in the group stage. The Czechs took a 2–0 lead through a Jan Koller header and a Jaroslav Plašil goal and the score remained 2–0 until the 75th minute, when Arda Turan scored making it 2–1. Nihat's first goal came in the 87th minute; Hamit Altıntop's cross was dropped by Petr Čech allowing Nihat tap the ball into the net. He scored his second goal one minute later; a brilliant, curling strike from outside the box, helping Turkey win the match 3–2.

Nihat was ruled out of Turkey's semi-final with Germany due to a thigh injury, which ultimately required surgery and prevented him from playing for Villarreal in the early part of the 2008–09 season.

Coaching career
On 6 July 2012, it was reported that Nihat has joined the coaching staff at his former club Villarreal as an assistant-manager of the youth team.

Career statistics

Club career

International goals
Scores and results list Turkey goal tally first, score column indicates score after each Nihat goal.

Honours
Beşiktaş
Turkish Cup: 1997–98, 2010–11
Turkish Super Cup: 1998

Turkey
 FIFA World Cup: third place: 2002
 FIFA Confederations Cup: third place 2003
 UEFA European Championship: semi-finals 2008

Individual
 Milliyet Sports Awards Footballer Of The Year: 2002
 La Liga Best Foreign Player: 2002–03
Beşiktaş J.K. Squads of Century (Silver Team)

References

External links

 
 An editorial piece on the Nihat – Kovacevic partnership by sports writer Phil Ball

1979 births
Living people
Turkish footballers
Association football forwards
Beşiktaş J.K. footballers
Real Sociedad footballers
Villarreal CF players
La Liga players
Expatriate footballers in Spain
Turkish expatriate sportspeople in Spain
2002 FIFA World Cup players
2003 FIFA Confederations Cup players
UEFA Euro 2008 players
Turkey international footballers
Turkey under-21 international footballers
Turkish expatriate footballers
Süper Lig players
Footballers from Istanbul
Turkey youth international footballers
People named in the Panama Papers